Gradišče is a small settlement south of Rob in the Municipality of Velike Lašče in central Slovenia. It is part of the traditional region of Lower Carniola and is now included in the Central Slovenia Statistical Region.

References

External links
Gradišče on Geopedia

Populated places in the Municipality of Velike Lašče